Journalists for Human Rights (JHR) is Canada's largest international media development organization. Based in Toronto, Ontario, Canada, JHR was founded in 2002 by Benjamin Peterson and Alexandra Sicotte-Levesque in 2002. JHR's mission is to inspire and mobilize media to cover human rights stories in ways that help communities help themselves. The organization's vision is for everyone in the world to access their human rights.

JHR believes that, "Creating rights awareness is the first and most necessary step to ending the abuse of human rights. By mobilizing the media to spread human rights awareness, JHR informs people about human rights, empowering marginalized communities to stand up, speak out, and protect themselves.” JHR has partnered with over 400 media organizations in 29 different countries to train over 17,650 journalists. Their human rights stories have reached over 76 million people.

JHR employs a rights-based "reciprocal change" approach, a process that involves local media partnerships and consultations with editors and owners, working journalists, students, civil society and other relevant stakeholders within a region.

JHR is currently led by Rachel Pulfer, its Executive Director. It has ongoing programs in Mali, Kenya, and works with Syrian journalists in Turkey, Tunisia, South Africa, the Democratic Republic of Congo and Canada.

Activities

The Democratic Republic of Congo 
Since 2007, JHR has worked with over 1450 journalists and journalism students in the DRC to produce media about human rights abuses, crime, corruption, democracy, and good governance. JHR initiatives have built a network of ten autonomous press clubs that span the country, and work to promote coverage of human rights issues. JHR's work in the DRCongo is currently supported by Global Affairs Canada.

Jordan 
To date, JHR has trained over 250 Jordanian journalists, journalism graduates and students on human rights reporting, the majority of which have been women. JHR's commitment to improving accessibility is demonstrated through the creation of online platform Maidan. Maidan is a platform that enables the public to participate in the process of collecting data and reporting human rights violations to hold governing bodies accountable, and acts as a resource for media and CSOs. Through training, public engagement and story production, JHR has worked to increase freedom of expression in Jordan and create a space for more open, informed and constructive dialogue on human rights issues affecting the country.

South Africa 
In 2017, JHR worked in partnership with the University of Witwatersrand and Ryerson University (now Toronto Metropolitan University) to launch the Journalism and Media Lab (JAMLab). Six teams of young South African journalists and media entrepreneurs entered the lab to incubate or accelerate their ideas for six months. Teams had access to mentorship, facilities, and contacts who supported them as they worked to develop new ideas in media, determine how to reach new audiences and figure out how best to sustain themselves with new revenue.

Syria 
Since 2017, JHR has created a network of 175 Syrian journalists working inside and outside of Syria, in order to ensure that outlets working in different geographic territories can share resources, collaborate on tough stories and given outlets access to territories they cannot usually work in freely. The project working with Syrian journalists is funded by the United Nations Democracy Fund and Global Affairs Canada.

South Sudan 
JHR has partnered with UNESCO and the UN Mission in South Sudan (UNMISS) to train over 150 journalists, and enhanced and developed the skills of 20 media managers. JHR has also trained 50 government representatives on communicating with media and on human rights issues in order to build bridges between the government, civil society, and the media to better understand the role of each sector in public life.

Canada 
Since the 2013 launch of JHR's Indigenous Reporters Program, JHR has worked in Indigenous communities across northern Ontario to provide journalism and media literacy training. JHR has trained over 850 community members in 17 different Indigenous communities in Canada. They have produced more than 650 stories and new bulletins, reaching an audience of over 2.2 million people. JHR has also produced 29 scholarships and 40 internships for emerging Indigenous reporters to pursue post-secondary education and launch their careers in journalism.

Funding
JHR is a registered Canadian Charity. It receives funding from international and Canadian agencies and governments, foundations, and individual donors.

Financial contributors since 2013 include:

Media coverage and Partnerships
JHR has received  media attention in Canada, from The Globe and Mail, The Toronto Star, the Canadian Broadcasting Corporation and CTV.ca. In 2012, JHR partnered with CBC and Global News to send journalists from those networks to JHR projects to act as short-term journalism trainers. In May 2013, CTV's senior editor and news anchor Lisa LaFlamme mentored a network of JHR affiliated journalists in Goma (Eastern DRC), the centre of ongoing conflict and humanitarian crisis since 1998.

JHR partners with The Alva Foundation and Massey College on the Gordon N. Fisher-JHR Fellowship. The annual fellowship is part of the Southam Journalism Fellowships program at the University of Toronto's Massey College.

JHR partners with the Canadian Association of Journalism to present an annual award for human rights reporting and an award for an emerging Indigenous journalist. JHR also presents an annual award to a news organization or team for the best human rights coverage in Canada.

References

External links
Journalists for Human Rights

Organizations established in 2002
Canadian journalism organizations
International human rights organizations
2002 establishments in Ontario